8199400 Canada Inc. operating as Arctic Sunwest Charters was a charter airline based in Yellowknife, Northwest Territories, Canada. It operated passenger and cargo charter services in Canada's Arctic, with wheel, ski and float equipped aircraft. Its main base was Yellowknife Airport and also operated a float base on Great Slave Lake near the Yellowknife Water Aerodrome.

History
The airline was established in 1989 and was created from the Aviation Division of RTL-Robinson Enterprises. On the 31 August 2012, Arctic Sunwest Charters became part of the Ledcor Group of Companies. In 2013 it was fully integrated into its affiliate Summit Air.

Maintenance
The company was certified by Transport Canada as an Approved Maintenance Organization with aircraft maintenance engineers. They had  of hangar space available and provided maintenance services to other airlines.

Fleet

As of October 2012 the Arctic Sunwest Charters fleet consisted of the following aircraft:

Accidents and incidents

On 22 September 2011, a float equipped Arctic Sunwest Twin Otter, that had been charted by Avalon Rare Metals, crashed while landing at Yellowknife Water Aerodrome. The Twin Otter, GARW, was inbound from Thor Lake and carried seven passengers and two crew. All seven of the passengers were injured and both pilots were killed.

See also 
 List of defunct airlines of Canada

References

External links

Airlines established in 1989
Regional airlines of the Northwest Territories
Defunct airlines of Canada
Airlines disestablished in 2013
Defunct seaplane operators
Canadian companies established in 1989
Defunct companies of the Northwest Territories
Canadian companies disestablished in 2013